See also Zacharias Werner

Friedrich Werner (Gottleuba, Pirna, 3 October 1621 - 1660s?) was a German cornettist under Heinrich Schütz at the Dresden court. He was the brother of the Danzig cantor Christoph Werner (1617-1650).

References

1621 births
1660s deaths
German male musicians
Cornett players
Pupils of Heinrich Schütz